The 2009 Alexander Keith's Tankard (New Brunswick's men's provincial curling championship) was held February 11–15 at Thistle St. Andrews Curling Club in Saint John, New Brunswick. The winning team represented New Brunswick at the 2009 Tim Hortons Brier in Calgary.

Teams

Standings

Results

Draw 1
February 11, 1900

Draw 2
February 12, 0900

Draw 3
February 12, 1400

Draw 4
February 12, 1900

Draw 5
February 13, 1400

Draw 6
February 13, 1900

Draw 7
February 14, 0900

Tiebreaker
February 14, 1400

Playoffs

Semi-final
February 14, 1900

Final
February 15, 1400

External links
Thistle St. Andrews Curling Club

Alexander Keith's Tankard
Curling competitions in Saint John, New Brunswick
2009 in New Brunswick